In type theory, a polynomial functor (or container functor) is a kind of endofunctor of a category of types that is intimately related to the concept of inductive and coinductive types. Specifically, all W-types (resp. M-types) are (isomorphic to) initial algebras (resp. final coalgebras) of such functors.

Polynomial functors have been studied in the more general setting of a pretopos with Σ-types; this article deals only with the applications of this concept inside the category of types of a Martin-Löf style type theory.

Definition 

The pair is sometimes called a signature or a container. The polynomial functor associated to the container is defined as follows:

Note that this assignment is not only truly functorial in extensional type theories (see #Properties).

Properties 

In intensional type theories, such functions are not truly functors, because the universe type is not strictly a category (the field of homotopy type theory is dedicated to exploring how the universe type behaves more like a higher category). However, it is functorial up to propositional equalities, that is, the following identity types are inhabited:

Inline citations

References

External links 
 An extensive collection of Notes on Polynomial Functors

Type theory